Edward S. Lentol (December 26, 1909 – December 11, 1981) was an American lawyer and politician from New York.

Life
He was born on December 26, 1909, in Brooklyn, New York City, the son of Assemblyman Joseph Lentol (born 1875). He attended Public School No. 50, Eastern District High School, and St. John's University Pre-Law School. He graduated from St. John's University School of Law. He married Matilda A. Postis (died 1978), and they had three sons.

Lentol was a member of the New York State Assembly (Kings Co., 14th D.) from 1949 to 1962, sitting in the 167th, 168th, 169th, 170th, 171st, 172nd and 173rd New York State Legislatures.

He was a member of the New York State Senate from 1963 to 1972, sitting in the 174th, 175th, 176th, 177th, 178th and 179th New York State Legislatures. In November 1972, he was elected to the New York Supreme Court. After the death of his first wife he married Marie Zaino. He remained on the bench until his death on December 11, 1981, in New York Hospital in Manhattan.

His son Joseph Lentol (born 1943) is a member of the State Assembly, currently representing the 50th District.

Sources

1909 births
1981 deaths
Politicians from Brooklyn
Democratic Party members of the New York State Assembly
Democratic Party New York (state) state senators
New York Supreme Court Justices
20th-century American judges
Eastern District High School alumni
20th-century American politicians